Itamati is a village located in Nayagarh district of Odisha, India. It is 6 km from Nayagarh Town. Itamati is known as the major business centre of Nayagarh, Also known as the second largest village of Odisha.

Demographics
As of 2011 India census, Itamati has a population of 71640. Males constitute 53% (37,987) of the population and females 47% (33,654). Itamati has an average literacy rate of 76%, higher than the national average of 59.5%. 10% of the population is under 6 years of age. The majority of the population belongs to Hindu religion, although there are some Muslim and Christians beliefs are staying here.

Business
Being the Business centre of Nayagarh, Itamati reserves a marketplace in the centre of the Village. The marketplace covers a large area starting from Park Lane to Itamati Panchayat. Durga Bazar, Laxmi Bazaar and Ganesh Bazaar are the oldest (100 years of old) of all which holds some ancient shops. Being situated in National Highway one may find the tea and snacks shops opened for 24 hours in the Bus stand.

People
The Utkal Ghanta Kabi Jadumani Mahapatra was born at Itamati in the year 1783 and died in 1868. He was the principal poet during the rule of king Binayak Singh Mandhata. Bidyadhar Mohapatra of Mandhatapur was his Sanskrit grammar teacher. Kabi Jadumani wrote Raghab Bilasa and Prabandha Purnachandra. He is one of the best poets of Orissa. His creations could be compared with that of Kabisamrat Upendra Bhanja.

Notable people
 Late. Banshidhara Sahoo (born in 1942, died in 2020), "the first and only MLA" of Itamati from 1980 to 1985.

Education

Itamati has one degree college, one junior college, three high schools and six upper primary schools. Some of the educational institutes are:
 Baman Abakash Boys High School
 Narayani Girls Govt. High School
 Itamati M.E. School
 Panadevi U.P. School
 Narayani U.P. School (Panchayata field)
 Sri Aurobinda Integral School
 Saraswati Shishu Mandir
 Narayani U.P. School (sanatangi patana)
 Sainik B.grade School
 Rainbow English medium school
 Odisha Adarsha Vidyalaya, Notar, Nayagarh

There are 2 colleges in Itamati: Itamati College of Education & Technology (ICET) (Junior College) and Bansidhar Mahavidyalaya (Degree College). It has also some private computer centers for learning and private hostels for students.

Gods and temples
Itamati has a large number of temples. Some important ones are:
 Satyanarayan Temple also along with Shiva Temple near Itamati Gram Panchayat
 Maa Narayani Temple and balunkeswar Shiva Temple, Sani Temple near Gouda Sahi
 Jagannath temple in between Jagannath Sahi and Mohanty Sahi
 Gopinath Temple in Deula sahi and Radhakrishana Temple in Kansari Sahi
 Maa Bhairavi temple near medical road, Ekadalia sahi
 Chitrakuta Bihari matha in Pradhan Sahi and Radhakanta matha in Behera Sahi
 Danda Kamana Temples in Tanti Sahi, Paika Sahi and Khatia Sahi
 Maa Kali Temple in Ratnapur Patana (Badatangi Patana)
 Maa Mangala Temple near the entrance of Itamati (from Bhubaneswar) in the way to Narayani Patana (Tangi Tota).
 Maa Mangala Temple Behera Sahi between Itamati bazar and Muslim sahi
 A masjid in Muslim sahi

Festival
The well known festivals in Itamati are "Panchu Dola" and "Dasha Dola". The festival continues for four days. There are large swings for children, famous opera parties hold shows during the nights. People of Itamati are very eager to view such Opera shows. Dash Dola comes 10 days after Dola Purnima (Holi), in Chaitra Masa of the Oriya calendar (March and April). Rath Yatra (Car festival of Jagannath), Jhulan Yatra, Danda Yatra. Danda Yatra begins on an auspicious day before Mahabishuba Sankranti.The last day is known as Meru parva. People enjoy Danda Nacha during night of the festival. Udanda, Ganesh Puja, Laxmi Puja, Durga Puja, Kali Puja, Khudurukuni, Ramanavami, and Ram Charita Manas (9 days) are the other famous festivals of Gods and are celebrated with great pump and show in Itamati. Also Itamati people celebrate the jayanti of Utkal Ghanta Jadumani Mahapatra every year on 8 January.

Divisions
Itamati is sub-divided into 21 wards and 20 Sahi's. Some of the Sahi are Ratnapur Patna (Bada Tangi Patna), Sana Tangi Patana (Mathurapur Patna), Paika Sahi, Tanti Sahi, Pradhan Sahi, Nahara Sahi, Kansari Sahi, Teli Sahi, Khatia Sahi, Jagati Patna, Sana Harijan Sahi, Deula Sahi, Sundhi Sahi, Bada Harijan Sahi, Ek Dalia Sahi, Jagannath Sahi, Mohanty Sahi, Behera Sahi, Narayani Patna (Tangi Tota), Dengera Godi, Pratap Prasad (Majuriapalli). Of these, Ratnapur Patna is the largest among them containing 2 wards.

Water sources
Several tubewells are present in every sahi of Itamati. The road of several sahis are modified during "Pradhanamantri Gramya Sadaka Jojana" initiated by Atal Bihari Vajpayee in India. Several ponds (Badakalamai, Sanakalamai, Rajahuda, Badhi, Dangi, Jharana, and Pachari) are also present in Itamati which serve the bathing purpose of Itamati people. One of the distributaries of Kusumi passes through Pandusara and Champatipur which are the nearby villages of Itamati and serves the water distribution purpose to some cultivated lands as canal systems are available to few cultivated lands.

Politics
Itamati known as the fort of Congress.
Banshidhar Sahoo was the ex-MLA of Nayagarh. 
Manoj Kumar sahoo is the popular leader in Itamati. He was elected as sarapancha during the 2012 election..
Sonalika Manthan was elected as sarapancha of Itamati during the 2017 election.

References

Villages in Nayagarh district